Kamal Basu (22 August 1918 – 21 January 2013) was a Bengali Indian politician who had served as a mayor of Calcutta, India between 1985 and 1990.

Early life and education
Born to a progressive family, that included his grandfather, barrister Bhupendra Nath Bose, a former president of the Indian National Congress, he had studied economics at the Scottish Church College, and eventually earned a master's degree in political science from the University of Calcutta, where he subsequently studied law. He had joined a solicitor firm BN Basu & Co after passing law.

Career in politics and social life
At an early age, he joined the Communist Party of India and became a Member of Parliament for the Lok Sabha, from West Bengal's Diamond Harbour in the South 24 Parganas district in 1952. In 1964, when CPI split up, he joined the Communist Party of India (Marxist). He was associated with the CPI(M) for over four decades.

Later life
He became Calcutta's mayor in 1985. He was also actively associated with the establishment of Salt Lake Stadium, as a founder secretary of the society for sports and stadium. He used to make on-the-spot supervisions during its construction. He was also a patron of the Mohan Bagan club.

During the Sino-Indian War of 1962, he fought a legal battle on behalf of his Communist Party of India comrades who had been detained by the Government of India, on suspected loyalties.

He efforts were instrumental in saving the Shobhabazar Rajbari, often described as the native Town Hall, from destruction.

Death
He died in a private nursing home on 21 January 2013.

References

Further reading
Debasis Bose,  Kamal Kumar Basur Paribarik Prekshapat (in Bengali), Kolkata, 2010.

1918 births
2013 deaths
Politicians from Kolkata
Communist Party of India politicians from West Bengal
Communist Party of India (Marxist) politicians from West Bengal
India MPs 1952–1957
Mayors of Kolkata
Scottish Church College alumni
University of Calcutta alumni
Lok Sabha members from West Bengal
People from South 24 Parganas district